Michael John Storey, Baron Storey,  (born 25 May 1949) is a British Liberal Democrat politician. He is currently the party's spokesperson on education, families and young people in the House of Lords.

He was City Councillor for the Liverpool ward of Wavertree from 2004 to 2011 and Leader of Liverpool City Council from 1998 to 2005.

He was first elected to the Council in 1973, and became the youngest Chair of Education in the history of Liverpool from 1980 to 1983, during which time he was also Deputy Leader of the Council under Sir Trevor Jones.

Leader of the Council
In 1998 the Liberal Democrats gained control of Liverpool City Council and Storey became Council Leader. He aimed to set about rebuilding the city's reputation, cutting the council tax, improving services and attracting jobs and investment, while reducing the number of council employees by 5,000.

He was a central part of Liverpool's successful bid to become European Capital of Culture in 2008 and was widely credited with transforming the city and Council's reputation by cutting council tax (until then the highest in the country), improving council services (previously the worst in England) and attracting jobs and investment. 

He resigned as Council Leader on 25 November 2005 after being found to have breached the members' code of conduct, following the disclosure of correspondence with former Council media chief, Matt Finnegan, which appeared to show the two men seeking to pressure the departure of then Chief Executive, Sir David Henshaw. In 2009 he was present, as Lord Mayor, at a ceremony organised by Sons of Confederate Veterans, allegedly a Neo-Confederate organisation at Toxteth Park Cemetery rededicating the grave of Irvine Bulloch

He lost his seat to 18-year-old Jake Morrison in 2011.

Lord Mayor
Storey served as Lord Mayor of Liverpool for the Council session 2009–2010. He was preceded by Cllr Steve Rotheram and succeeded by Cllr Hazel Williams.

House of Lords
On 19 November 2010, it was announced that Storey would be created a life peer and will sit as a Liberal Democrat in the House of Lords. He was created Baron Storey, of Childwall in the City of Liverpool on 2 February 2011.

Storey is currently the Liberal Democrat education spokesman in the House of Lords and co-chair of the party parliamentary education, families and young people committee. He was a party whip between 2010–14 and a member of the Small and Medium Sized Enterprises Committee in 2012–13. He speaks on education, regeneration and the arts.

Storey is also a member of the Regional Growth Fund independent advisory panel and a trustee of Mersyside think-tank ExUrbe.

Awards
Storey was appointed an OBE for political services in 1994 and a CBE for services to regeneration in 2002. He is a retired primary school teacher and long-serving headteacher of Plantation Primary School, Halewood.

References

External links
Liverpool City Council
Liverpool Liberal Democrats
Plantation Primary School

1949 births
Liberal Democrats (UK) councillors
Councillors in Liverpool
Living people
Commanders of the Order of the British Empire
Alumni of Liverpool Hope University
Schoolteachers from Merseyside
Liberal Democrats (UK) life peers
Mayors of Liverpool
Leaders of local authorities of England
People from Childwall
Life peers created by Elizabeth II